Reyna René Reyes Stubblefield (born 16 February 2001) is an American-born Mexican footballer who plays as a midfielder or defender for the Mexico women's national team.

Early life
Reyes was born and raised in Garland, Texas to a Mexican father and an American mother.

High school and college career
Prior to college, Reyes attended Naaman Forest High School in Garland, Texas.

Reyes committed to play soccer for the University of Alabama, making her debut for the Crimson Tide on 23 August 2019 in a 1-0 defeat vs. BYU.

Club career
On 12 January 2023, Portland Thorns FC of the National Women's Soccer League selected Reyes with the fifth overall pick in the 2023 NWSL Draft.

International career
Reyes represented Mexico at two FIFA U-17 Women's World Cup editions (2016 and 2018), the 2018 CONCACAF Women's U-17 Championship, the 2019 Sud Ladies Cup and the 2020 CONCACAF Women's U-20 Championship. She made her senior debut on 24 February 2021 in a 0–0 friendly home draw against Costa Rica.

References

2001 births
Living people
Citizens of Mexico through descent
Mexican women's footballers
Women's association football midfielders
Women's association football defenders
Mexico women's international footballers
Mexican people of American descent
People from Garland, Texas
Soccer players from Texas
American women's soccer players
Alabama Crimson Tide women's soccer players
American sportspeople of Mexican descent
Portland Thorns FC draft picks